Kentucky Route 181 (KY 181) is a north–south state highway that traverses two counties in western Kentucky.

Route description

Todd County
KY 181 starts at a crossroads junction with U.S. Route 79 and Kentucky Route 2128 located near the Tennessee state border in the town of Guthrie, in southern Todd County. KY 181 has junctions with KY 294 and then a crossroad intersection with US 41. KY 181 goes north to intersect with KY 848, and then KY 104 before making it into the Todd County seat of Elkton. It intersects US Route 68 Business at the Todd County Courthouse in downtown Elkton. Further north, it crosses the divided four-lane Jefferson Davis Highway, the real US 68, which runs concurrently with KY 80 just north of the city limits. Kentucky Route 106 has a junction with KY 181 almost immediately after the US 68 junction. Junctions with KY 171 and KY 507 follows after KY 181 leaves the Elkton area.

At Clifty, Kentucky Route 107 runs concurrent with KY 181 for  through that community, with a junction with KY 890 located within that concurrency. At Tyewhopperty, it intersects KY 1785 shortly before entering Muhlenberg County.

Muhlenberg County
After making its entrance into Muhlenberg County, KY 181 has a junction with Kentucky Route 973, which provides access to the Lake Malone State Park. Another junction with KY 890 follows, and then KY 1163 (Old Russellville Pike) before reaching the city of Greenville. In downtown Greenville, it would meet U.S. Route 62 (US 62) and KY 176 in the town square. After the brief concurrency with US 62, KY 181 crosses the four-lane KY 189 by-pass before meeting the Exit 53 interchange of the Wendell H. Ford Western Kentucky Parkway. It then intersects KY 70 at Midland before reaching its northern terminus at the KY 81 junction in the community of Bremen just short of the McLean County line.

Major intersections

References

External links
KY 181 at Kentucky Roads

0181
0181
0181